The Twin Cities Marathon (TCM) is an annual marathon in the Minneapolis–Saint Paul area which normally takes place the first weekend in October. The race is often called "The Most Beautiful Urban Marathon in America" due to a course that winds through downtown districts, then along parkways that hug lakes and waterways all throughout dense urban forests in the neighborhoods of both cities.

The first Twin Cities marathon took place on October 3, 1982 after both Minneapolis and St. Paul combined their separate marathon events. Its earliest predecessor, the Land of Lakes Marathon, began in 1963.

It is one of the top 10 largest marathons in the US. In 2006 the race agreed to its first corporate sponsorship, with Medtronic, Inc. The official name of the marathon changed in 2006 to Medtronic Twin Cities Marathon (MTCM).

In addition to the marathon, the MTCM has expanded to a full weekend of events providing opportunities for runners and wheelers of all ages and abilities. Sunday events for adults include the Medtronic TC 10 Mile, or "Shortcut to the Capitol". Medtronic TC Family Events take place on Saturday for children and adults of all ages. Saturday's races include the TC 10K, TC 5K, Diana Pierce Family Mile, Toddler Trot, Diaper Dash, and Mascot Invitational. In addition, Medtronic and the marathon's organizers sponsor a one-mile road race, for anyone from novices to professionals.

In 2006 the Twin Cities Marathon was ranked as the third most competitive marathon for American runners by Running Times magazine.

In the years since inauguration, the marathon has grown to a full weekend of events including the addition of the Medtronic TC 10 Mile race as a Sunday companion event to the marathon.

The event is put on by thousands of volunteers, many of whom return each year. In 2004, nearly 2,500 volunteers, some who said they were motivated by an expression of their values and a love for the sport, aided the management of the race weekend and the runners.

History

The Minnesota Distance Running Association created the event's earliest ancestor, originally called the Land of Lakes Marathon in 1963. Spectators outnumbered runners that inaugural year as just five participants, all male, began the 26.2 mile trek along Minneapolis' streets and parkways.

In 1976, the race was renamed the City of Lakes Marathon and moved to a four-lap course around Lake Calhoun and Lake Harriet. By 1981, with the running boom echoing across the country, the race took just a month to fill its limit of 1,700 runners. In the same year, Minneapolis' counterpart established its own marathon, the St. Paul Marathon, which followed a course around Minnesota's capital city. The race launched successfully, drawing approximately 2,000 runners in its first and only running.

In 1982, organizers from the St. Paul and City of Lakes marathons combined efforts to establish the Twin Cities Marathon. Race officials realized that a marathon which connected Minneapolis to St. Paul, combining the spectacular autumn beauty of both cities, would be greater attraction than two competing marathons on either side of the Mississippi River. The inaugural Twin Cities Marathon attracted 4,563 entrants, which established an entry record for a first-time race in the United States.

A slight kerfuffle occurred in 2004 when Irina Permitina finished first for the women, but unofficial results showed her finishing with a time of 2:26:53. Permitina, who was back in Minnesota after having been trampled at the start of Grandma's Marathon in June, was sure that the time was incorrect. Officials corroborated the four official timing devices to find that her time was indeed incorrect—she had actually run a 2:26:50.7—which was three-tenths of a second faster than the previous record set by fellow Russian Zinaida Semenova in 2001. However, marathon race officials round the tenth of a second up to the nearest second, so the time was ruled a tie with the previous record. Permitina submitted a protest, but was moot—the women's course record for the Twin Cities marathon is held by two female runners.

In 2006, Oakton, Virginia resident Jacob Frey ran, finishing eighth in 2:20:09 (just behind Minnesota resident Jason Lehmkuhle). Frey would represent the United States in the 2007 Pan American Games Marathon and place fourth. He eventually moved to Minneapolis and in 2017 become mayor.

2008 marked the first year that one of the events hosted a USATF championship. Both the 10 mile race as well as the marathon have been US championships. The years that the races serve as championships, prize money is increased and the field is much deeper.

2017 marked the first time that the 10 mile race (TC10) had more entrants (12,484) than the marathon (9,851).

The 2020 edition of the race was cancelled due to the coronavirus pandemic, with all registrants receiving a partial credit for 2021 or 2022.

Course
The course begins near U.S. Bank Stadium in downtown Minneapolis, and winds around several of the city's well-known lakes (including Lake of the Isles, Bde Maka Ska, Lake Harriet, and Lake Nokomis) before turning north along the banks of the Mississippi River. The course follows the river for several miles before crossing into Saint Paul, and then proceeds east up Summit Avenue to finish at the Minnesota State Capitol. Miles 21–23 of the course proceed on a steady uphill from the river, and are considered among the more challenging finishes among American marathons, although the downhill last half-mile allows for relatively strong finishes.

Winners

Marathon 

 * = Doping violation: Tested positive for banned substance EPO (Erythropoietin)

TC 10 Mile 
Key:   

 Men's championship only.  Women's championship only

See also
Grandma's Marathon
Minneapolis Marathon

Notes

References

External links
Official website
Association of Road Racing Statisticians' profile of the Twin Cities Marathon

Marathons in the United States
Sports in Minneapolis–Saint Paul
Foot races in Minnesota
Marathons in Minnesota
Tourist attractions in Minneapolis
Recurring sporting events established in 1982
Annual events in Minnesota
Annual sporting events in the United States
1982 establishments in Minnesota